Catherine of Russia ( is a 1963 biographical drama film directed by Umberto Lenzi, and starring Hildegard Knef.

Cast 
Hildegard Knef as  Catherine the Great 
Sergio Fantoni as   Orlov
Giacomo Rossi Stuart as   Count Poniatowski
Raoul Grassilli as   Czar Peter III
Angela Cavo as   Anna
Ennio Balbo as   Count Panin 
Enzo Fiermonte as   General Munic
Tina Lattanzi as   Czarina Elizabeth 
Tullio Altamura as   Latouche

Release
Catherine of Russia was released in Italy on 12 January 1963.

References

Footnotes

Sources

External links

1963 films
1960s biographical films
Films directed by Umberto Lenzi
Films about Catherine the Great
Italian biographical films
1960s historical films
Italian historical films
French historical films
Yugoslav historical films
French biographical films
Yugoslav biographical films
1960s Italian films
1960s French films